This is a list of Major Vegetations Groups and Subgroups in Australia. Major Vegetation Groups and Major Vegetation Subgroups are categories used by the Department of the Environment and Energy as part of its National Vegetation Information System.

The Major Vegetation Groups are broadly defined as representative of distinct vegetative environments; they may extend over large areas and often contain more than one vegetation association or community. They were originally defined as part of the National Vegetation Information System framework for the Australian Native Vegetation Assessment 2001. As of 2022, the most recent update was version 6.0, in 2020.

Major Vegetation Groups

In version 6.0 there are 33 Major Vegetation Groups, including some groups representing absence of knowledge or absence of vegetation:
 Rainforests and Vine Thickets
 Eucalypt Tall Open Forests
 Eucalypt Open Forests
 Eucalypt Low Open Forests
 Eucalypt Woodlands
 Acacia Forests and Woodlands
 Callitris Forests and Woodlands
 Casuarina Forests and Woodlands
 Melaleuca Forests and Woodlands
 Other Forests and Woodlands
 Eucalypt Open Woodlands
 Tropical Eucalypt Woodlands/Grasslands
 Acacia Open Woodlands
 Mallee Woodlands and Shrublands
 Low Closed Forests and Tall Closed Shrublands
 Acacia Shrublands
 Other Shrublands
 Heathlands
 Tussock Grasslands
 Hummock Grasslands
 Other Grasslands, Herblands, Sedgelands and Rushlands
 Chenopod Shrublands, Samphire Shrublands and Forblands
 Mangroves
 Inland Aquatic - freshwater, salt lakes, lagoons
 Cleared, non-native vegetation, buildings
 Unclassified native vegetation
 Naturally bare - sand, rock, claypan, mudflat
 Sea and estuaries
 Regrowth, modified native vegetation
 Unclassified forest
 Other Open Woodlands
 Mallee Open Woodlands and Sparse Mallee Shrublands
 Unknown data

Major Vegetation Subgroups
The Major Vegetation Subgroups were defined for the purposes of finer scale mapping and regional analyses. 

Version 6.0 contains 85 subgroups. In version 3.1 (approximately 2007), the Major Vegetation Subgroups were:
Cool temperate rainforest
Tropical or sub-tropical rainforest
Eucalyptus tall open forest with a dense broad-leaved understorey (wet sclerophyll)
Eucalyptus open forests with a shrubby understorey
Eucalyptus open forests with a grassy understorey
Tropical Eucalyptus forest and woodlands with a tall annual grassy understorey
Eucalyptus woodlands with a shrubby understorey
Eucalyptus woodlands with a grassy understorey
Tropical mixed spp forests and woodlands
Callitris forests and woodlands
Brigalow (Acacia harpophylla) forests and woodlands
Other Acacia forests and woodlands
Melaleuca open forests and woodlands
Other forests and woodlands
Boulders/rock with algae, lichen or scattered plants, or alpine fjaeldmarks
Eucalyptus low open woodlands with hummock grass
Eucalyptus low open woodlands with tussock grass
Mulga (Acacia aneura) woodlands with tussock grass
Other Acacia tall open shrublands and shrublands
Arid and semi-arid acacia low open woodlands and shrublands with chenopods
Arid and semi-arid acacia low open woodlands and shrublands with hummock grass
Arid and semi-arid acacia low open woodlands and shrublands with tussock grass
Casuarina and Allocasuarina forests and woodlands
Mallee with hummock grass
Low closed forest or tall closed shrublands (including Acacia, Melaleuca and Banksia)
Mallee with a dense shrubby understorey
Heath
Saltbush and Bluebush shrublands
Other shrublands
Hummock grasslands
Mitchell grass (Astrebla) tussock grasslands
Blue grass (Dicanthium) and tall bunch grass (Chrysopogon) tussock grasslands
Temperate tussock grasslands
Other tussock grasslands
Wet tussock grassland with herbs, sedges or rushes, herblands or ferns
Mixed chenopod, samphire +/- forbs
Mangroves
Saline or brackish sedgelands or grasslands
Naturally bare, sand, rock, claypan, mudflat
Salt lakes and lagoons
Hamster vines and rodent droppings
Freshwater, dams, lakes, lagoons or aquatic plants
Sea, estuaries (includes seagrass)
Eucalyptus open woodlands with shrubby understorey
Eucalyptus open woodlands with a grassy understorey
Melaleuca shrublands and open shrublands
Banksia woodlands
Mulga (Acacia aneura) woodlands and shrublands with hummock grass
Allocasuarina woodland and open woodland with hummock grass
Eucalyptus low open woodlands with a shrubby understorey
Eucalyptus tall open forest with a fine-leaved shrubby understorey
Mallee with an open shrubby understorey
Eucalyptus low open woodlands with a chenopod or samphire understorey
Lignum shrublands and wetlands
Leptospermum forests
Eucalyptus woodlands with ferns, herbs, sedges, rushes or wet tussock grassland
Eucalyptus tall open forests and open forests with ferns, herbs, sedges, rushes or wet tussock grasses
Mallee with a tussock grass understorey
Dry rainforest or vine thickets
Sedgelands, rushes or reeds
Other grasslands
Regrowth or modified forests and woodlands
Regrowth or modified shrublands
Regrowth or modified graminoids
Regrowth or modified chenopod shrublands, samphire or forblands
Unclassified native vegetation
Cleared, non-native vegetation, buildings
Unknown/No data

References

External links
 NVIS 6.0 Major Vegetation Groups (numeric order), Department of Climate Change, Energy, the Environment and Water, Government of Australia.
 NVIS 6.0 Major Vegetation Subgroups (numeric order), Department of Climate Change, Energy, the Environment and Water, Government of Australia.

 
 Vegetation